HMS Myngs was a Z-class destroyer of the Royal Navy built as a flotilla leader by Vickers-Armstrong, Tyneside. She served during the Second World War, participating in operations in the North Sea and off the Norwegian coast, before taking part in some of the Arctic convoys. She spent a further ten years in Royal Navy service after the end of the war, before being sold to the Egyptian Navy, which operated her as El Qaher. She was sunk in an Israeli air attack on 16 May 1970.

Second World War
On commissioning and work up Myngs joined the 2nd Destroyer Flotilla, as part of the Home Fleet. She operated in the North West approaches and escorted some Russian convoys. She also took part attacks on the German battleship , acting as part of a screen to protect the aircraft carriers who took part in the operation.

In April 1945 she transferred to the 4th Destroyer Flotilla.

Postwar service
Between June 1946 and August 1947 Myngs was part of the 4th Destroyer Flotilla of the Home Fleet. In August 1948 she was part of the 3rd Escort Flotilla, based at Portland. Between April 1949 and August 1954 she was part of the 2nd Training Flotilla at Portland. In September 1954 she was placed in reserve pending conversion to a Type 15 frigate. In June 1953 she attended the Coronation Review at Spithead.

Egyptian service
Myngs was sold to Egypt in 1955 and commissioned into the Egyptian Navy as El Qaher. She was refitted by White, Cowes and sailed for Egypt on 28 August 1956. She returned to White's for another refit between May 1963 and July 1964.

On 16 May 1970, El Qaher was sunk by Israeli Air Force aircraft at Berenice, Egypt, during the War of Attrition.

References

Publications

External links
 Royal Navy History - HMS Myngs
 HMS Myngs at naval-history.net

 

W and Z-class destroyers
1944 ships
World War II destroyers of the United Kingdom
Destroyers sunk by aircraft
Naval ships of Egypt
Maritime incidents in 1970
Ships built on the River Tyne
Ships built by Vickers Armstrong